Hemmeligheden (The Secret) is a Norwegian silent film from 1912 that is considered lost.

Plot
The film was a drama in which a young woman from a coastal town gets to know an artist from Paris. They start a relationship and she has a daughter. The young woman, Elise, leaves, and on the steamship home to Norway she throws the child overboard. When she returns home, she marries Lieutenant Almeng. It turns out that the child she threw overboard did not die, but was found by a fishing couple, who have adopted the child. One day, Elise and the lieutenant meet the fisherman, and Elise breaks down and tells her husband the story of what happened. The lieutenant first takes the matter very sternly, but when he sees how unhappy this has made Elise, he goes to the fisherman and retrieves his wife's daughter, and he promises to treat her as though she were his own child.

Cast
 Christian Nobel as Lieutenant Almeng
 Signe Danning as Elsie Halling
 Pehr Qværnstrøm as a fisherman
 Robert Sperati as Halling the landowner
 Emmy Worm-Müller as the fisherman's wife

References

External links
 
 Hemmeligheden at Norsk filmografi

1912 films
Norwegian drama films
Norwegian black-and-white films
Norwegian silent films
1912 drama films
Lost Norwegian films
Silent drama films